Erosida yucatana is a species of beetle in the family Cerambycidae. It was described by Giesbert in 1985.

References

Eburiini
Beetles described in 1985